Joseph Linden Fitzclarence Hamilton (born in Guyana) is a Guyanese politician. Hamilton was born Triumph, British Guiana. Between 1977 and 1987, Hamilton was a priest of the House of Israel. At the 2014 Walter Rodney inquiry, Hamilton testified that the House of Israel committed “oppressive and terrorizing acts on behalf of the People's National Congress (PNC).”

Hamilton is the current Guyanese Minister of Labour in Guyana. Hamilton was sworn in as Minister under President Irfaan Ali cabinet. He was appointed Minister in August 2020. Prior to his appointment as Minister, he was the Parliamentary Secretary under the Ministry of Health.

References 

Living people
1950s births
People from Demerara-Mahaica
Members of the National Assembly (Guyana)
Government ministers of Guyana
People's Progressive Party (Guyana) politicians
South American political people
21st-century Guyanese politicians
Guyanese religious leaders